Gabriele Kelm is a German rower who competed for the SC Dynamo Berlin / Sportvereinigung (SV) Dynamo. She won the medals at the international rowing competitions.

References 

East German female rowers
Living people
Year of birth missing (living people)